Bembecia abromeiti is a moth of the family Sesiidae. It is found on the Balearic Island of Mallorca.

References

Moths described in 2000
Sesiidae
Endemic fauna of the Balearic Islands
Fauna of Mallorca
Moths of Europe